Andrea Bronzini (Viadana, 29 June 1997) is an Italian rugby union player. His usual position is as a centre and he currently plays for Calvisano in Top12, after the experience with San Donà.

In 2017–18 Pro14 and 2018–19 Pro14 seasons, he played for Benetton.

After playing for Italy Under 20, in 2016 and 2017, in 2018 Bronzini was named in the Emerging Italy squad for the World Rugby Nations Cup.

References

External links 
Ultimate Rugby Profile
It's Rugby England Profile

Italian rugby union players
1997 births
Living people
Sportspeople from the Province of Mantua
Rugby union centres
Rugby Viadana players
Benetton Rugby players
Rugby Calvisano players